"Happy?" is a song by American heavy metal band Mudvayne and the second single from their 2005 album Lost and Found. It was the theme song of WWE Vengeance 2005 and has been played as a commercial bumper track for The Jim Rome Show. "Happy?" was named both the No. 1 Headbangers Ball Video of 2005 and Billboard Monitor's Active Rock Song of the Year. The song held the No. 1 spot on the Billboard Hot Mainstream Rock Tracks chart for one week, and reached No. 8 on the Hot Modern Rock Tracks chart.

The song is featured in the video game MX vs. ATV Untamed as a jukebox song. It is Mudvayne's most successful song chart-wise, making it their signature song.

Music video
The music video for "Happy?" begins with the band, dressed entirely in black, playing the song in a field full of flowers on a sunny day. But after the first chorus, the sky darkens and a tornado emerges, seemingly out of nowhere, trying to sweep up the band. The storm subsides suddenly at the end of the video, showing that Mudvayne is unharmed and well.

The cover photo for the "Forget to Remember" single appears to have been taken during the filming of the "Happy?" video.

Charts

In popular culture
"Happy?" was made available for download on July 3, 2012 to play in Rock Band 3 Basic and PRO mode utilizing real guitar / bass guitar, and MIDI compatible electronic drum kits.

References

External links
Video
Mudvayne Official Homepage

2005 singles
Mudvayne songs
Songs written by Chad Gray
Songs written by Ryan Martinie
Songs written by Matthew McDonough
Songs written by Greg Tribbett
2005 songs
Epic Records singles